These are the partial results of the athletics competition at the 1963 Mediterranean Games taking place between 27 and 29 September in Naples, Italy.

Results

100 meters
Heats – 28 September

Final – 28 September

200 meters
Heats – 27 September

Final – 28 September

400 meters
Heats – 27 September

Final – 28 September

800 meters
Heats – 27 September

Final – 28 September

1500 meters
29 September

5000 meters
28 September

10,000 meters

Marathon
28 September

110 meters hurdles
Heats

Final

400 meters hurdles
Heats

Final

4 × 100 meters relay

4 × 400 meters relay
29 September

50 kilometers walk
29 September

High jump

Pole vault

Long jump
28 September

Triple jump
27 September

Shot put

Discus throw

Hammer throw

Javelin throw
27 September

Notes

References

Day 1 results
Day 2 results
Day 3 results

Mediterranean Games
1963